Henderson House, and variations, may refer to:

Capt. Charles C. Henderson House, Arkadelphia, Arkansas, listed on the National Register of Historic Places (NRHP) in Clark County, Arkansas
Henderson House (Little Rock, Arkansas), listed on the NRHP in Pulaski County, Arkansas
Henderson House (Denver, Colorado), a Denver Landmark
T. G. Henderson House, Lake City, listed on the NRHP in Columbia County, Florida
Fletcher Henderson House, Cuthbert, Georgia, listed on the NRHP in Randolph County, Georgia
Henderson-Orr House, Stallings Crossing, Georgia, listed on the NRHP in Coweta County, Georgia
Walter Irving and Jean Henderson House, Hilo, Hawaii, listed on the NRHP in Hawaii County, Hawaii
Henderson House (University of Chicago), a college house of the University of Chicago, Chicago, Illinois
Frank B. Henderson House, Elmhurst, Illinois, listed on the NRHP in DuPage County, Illinois
Daniel and Nancy Swaford Henderson House, Earlham, Iowa, listed on the NRHP in Madison County, Iowa
Sarah L. Henderson House, Stafford, Kansas, listed on the NRHP in Stafford County, Kansas
Tom Henderson House, Lewisport, Kentucky, listed on the NRHP in Hancock County, Kentucky
Isham Henderson House, New Castle, Kentucky, listed on the NRHP in Henry County, Kentucky
Dwight-Henderson House, Great Barrington, Massachusetts, listed on the NRHP in Berkshire County, Massachusetts
Edward Peirce House-Henderson House of Northeastern University, Weston, Massachusetts, listed on the NRHP in Middlesex County, Massachusetts
Henderson-Britton House, Natchez, Mississippi, listed on the NRHP in Adams County, Mississippi
Hall-Henderson House, Sardis, Mississippi, listed on the NRHP in Panola County, Mississippi
Dr. Generous Henderson House, Kansas City, Missouri, listed on the NRHP in Jackson County, Missouri
Isabelle Bowen Henderson House and Gardens, Raleigh, North Carolina, listed on the NRHP in Wake County, North Carolina
Joseph Henderson House, Columbus, Ohio, listed on the Columbus Register of Historic Properties 

Dr. David W. Henderson House, Marysville, Ohio, listed on the NRHP in Union County, Ohio
John Henderson House, West Andover, Ohio, listed on the NRHP in Ashtabula County, Ohio
Dr. William Henderson House, Hummelstown, Pennsylvania, listed on the NRHP in Dauphin County, Pennsylvania
Henderson-Metz House, Pittsburgh, Pennsylvania, listed on the NRHP in Allegheny, Pennsylvania
Irby-Henderson-Todd House, Laurens, South Carolina, listed on the NRHP in Laurens County, South Carolina
Otway Henderson House, McCormick, South Carolina, listed on the NRHP in McCormick County, South Carolina
William Henderson House, Louisville, Tennessee, listed on the NRHP in Blount County, Tennessee
Logan Henderson Farm, Murfreesboro, Tennessee, listed on the NRHP in Rutherford County, Tennessee
Wright-Henderson-Duncan House, Granbury, Texas, listed on the NRHP in Hood County, Texas
S. W. Henderson-Bridges House, Lufkin, Texas, listed on the NRHP in Angelina County, Texas
S. L. Henderson House, San Angelo, Texas, listed on the NRHP in Tom Green County, Texas
William Jasper, Jr., and Elizabeth Henderson House, Cannonville, Utah, listed on the NRHP in Garfield County, Utah
Henderson House (Dumfries, Virginia)
Henderson House (Tumwater, Washington)

See also
Henderson Hall (disambiguation)

Architectural disambiguation pages